The 2019–20 Melbourne City FC W-League season is the club's fifth season in the W-League, the premier competition for women's football in Australia. The team is based at the City Football Academy at La Trobe University and play home games at AAMI Park, CB Smith Reserve and ABD Stadium. Rado Vidošić was head coach of the club for the second consecutive year.

Players

 
 
 

Source: Melbourne City FC W-League Players

Notable signings

W-League

League table

Results summary

Results by round

Matches

References

External links
 Official Website

Melbourne City FC (A-League Women) seasons